Apirana is a male given name of New Zealand Maori origin meaning 'Pleasant; Kind' and may refer to:

Āpirana Ngata (1874–1950), politician and lawyer
Api Pewhairangi (born 1992), Ireland rugby league player
Apirana Taylor (born 1956), poet and novelist